The Underwater Orienteering World Championships is the peak international event for the underwater sport of underwater orienteering.  The event is conducted on behalf of the Confédération Mondiale des Activités Subaquatiques (CMAS) by an affiliated national federation.  The championships was first held in 1973.  Currently, it is held every 2 years on years ending with an odd number.

History

Future championships 
As of April 2013, the details of the next World Championships had not been announced.

References

External links
 Underwater Orienteering - Orientierungstauchen - World Championships 1985

Orienteering
Underwater orienteering